The 1998 SEC Championship Game was won by the Tennessee Volunteers 24-14 over the Mississippi State Bulldogs. The game was played in the Georgia Dome in Atlanta on December 5, 1998, and was televised to a national audience on ABC.

Mississippi State took a 14-10 lead in the fourth quarter with an 83-yard punt return. The game was clinched when Tee Martin threw two touchdown passes (Peerless Price and Cedric Wilson) in the span of 32 seconds in the fourth quarter.

References

External links
Recap of the game from SECsports.com

Championship Game
SEC Championship Game
Mississippi State Bulldogs football games
Tennessee Volunteers football games
December 1998 sports events in the United States
1998 in sports in Georgia (U.S. state)
1998 in Atlanta